Whiton may refer to:

Surname 
Edward V. Whiton (1805–1859), American lawyer, jurist, and Wisconsin pioneer
Emelyn Whiton (1916–1962), American sailor
Herman Whiton (1904–1967), American sailor

Places 
 Whiton, Alabama
 Whiton, Maryland